Qualification for the 2010 Little League World Series took place in eight United States regions and eight international regions from June through August 2010.

United States

Great Lakes

The tournament took place in Indianapolis, Indiana on August 6–14.

Mid-Atlantic

The tournament took place in Bristol, Connecticut on August 6–16.

Midwest

The tournament took place in Indianapolis, Indiana on August 7–14.

Note: The Dakotas are organized into a single Little League district.

New England

The tournament took place in Bristol, Connecticut on August 6–14.

Northwest

The tournament took place in San Bernardino, California on August 6–14.

Southeast

The tournament took place in Warner Robins, Georgia on August 7–13.

Southwest

The tournament took place in Waco, Texas on August 6–12.

West

The tournament took place in San Bernardino, California on August 6–15.

International

Asia-Pacific

The tournament took place in Surabaya, Indonesia on July 10–15.

1 Republic of China, commonly known as Taiwan, due to complicated relations with People's Republic of China, is recognized by the name Chinese Taipei by majority of international organizations including Little League Baseball(LLB). For more information, please see Cross-Strait relations.

Canada

The tournament took place August 7–14.

(*): host league

Caribbean

The tournament took place in Humacao, Puerto Rico on July 3–10.

Europe

The tournament took place in Kutno, Poland on July 27–August 4.

Japan

Two rounds each were played on July 3 and 10 to determine a winner.

Latin America

The tournament took place in Guatemala City on July 25–31.

Mexico

The tournament took place in Monterrey on July 20–29. The 2010 tournament is named "Ramiro Treviño".

Phase 1

Phase 2

Middle East-Africa
The tournament took place in Kutno, Poland on July 21–24.

References
2010 Little League Baseball Tournament Schedule

2010 Little League World Series